Globidrillia hemphillii is a species of sea snail, a marine gastropod mollusk in the family Drilliidae.

Description
The small, slender, polished shell has a long spire and a short aperture terminating in a short, broad, open siphonal canal. It is horn-colored. There are inconspicuous longitudinal ribs on the spire, which are obsolete on the body whorl,. The sutural line is impressed. (described as Drillia hemphillii)

Distribution
This species occurs in the demersal zone of the Pacific Ocean off Lower California.

References

 Turgeon, D.; Quinn, J.F.; Bogan, A.E.; Coan, E.V.; Hochberg, F.G.; Lyons, W.G.; Mikkelsen, P.M.; Neves, R.J.; Roper, C.F.E.; Rosenberg, G.; Roth, B.; Scheltema, A.; Thompson, F.G.; Vecchione, M.; Williams, J.D. (1998). Common and scientific names of aquatic invertebrates from the United States and Canada: mollusks. 2nd ed. American Fisheries Society Special Publication, 26. American Fisheries Society: Bethesda, MD (USA). . IX, 526 + cd-rom pp. (look up in IMIS) page(s): 102
  Tucker, J.K. 2004 Catalog of recent and fossil turrids (Mollusca: Gastropoda). Zootaxa 682:1–1295

External links

Globidrillia
Gastropods described in 1871